Conus ambiguus, common name the doubtful cone, is a species of sea snail, a marine gastropod mollusk in the family Conidae, the cone snails and their allies.

Like all species within the genus Conus, these snails are predatory and venomous. They are capable of "stinging" humans, therefore live ones should be handled carefully or not at all.

Description
Conus ambiguus was originally discovered and described in both identical Latin and English language texts by Lovell Augustus Reeve in 1844.

Reeve's type description reads as follows:

The shell of Conus ambiguus is whitish, with obscure, light brown bands, and longitudinal streaks. The spire is ornamented with arched brownish spots.

Dimensions of the shell of type specimen is 39 x 22 mm. The type specimen is stored in Zoölogisch Museum Amsterdam (Zoological Museum of the University of Amsterdam).

Distribution
The type locality was not specified by Reeve.
This species occurs in the Atlantic Ocean off West Africa (Senegal, Guinea Bissau) and Angola.

References
This article incorporates public domain text from references.

 Kiener L.C. 1844-1850. Spécies général et iconographie des coquilles vivantes. Vol. 2. Famille des Enroulées. Genre Cone (Conus, Lam.), pp. 1-379, pl. 1-111 [pp. 1-48 (1846); 49-160 (1847); 161-192 (1848); 193-240 (1849); 241-[379](assumed to be 1850); plates 4,6 (1844); 2-3, 5, 7-32, 34-36, 38, 40-50 (1845); 33, 37, 39, 51-52, 54-56, 57-68, 74-77 (1846); 1, 69-73, 78-103 (1847); 104-106 (1848); 107 (1849); 108-111 (1850)]. Paris, Rousseau & J.B. Baillière
 Puillandre N., Duda T.F., Meyer C., Olivera B.M. & Bouchet P. (2015). One, four or 100 genera? A new classification of the cone snails. Journal of Molluscan Studies. 81: 1-23

External links

 Cone Shells - Knights of the Sea
 

ambiguus
Gastropods described in 1844
Molluscs of the Atlantic Ocean
Molluscs of Angola
Invertebrates of West Africa